Beachton is an unincorporated community in Grady County, Georgia, United States. It is the location of Susina Plantation, which is listed on the U.S. National Register of Historic Places.

References

Unincorporated communities in Grady County, Georgia
Unincorporated communities in Georgia (U.S. state)